Federico Angelo Cesi (26 February 1585 – 1 August 1630) was an Italian scientist, naturalist, and founder of the Accademia dei Lincei. On his father's death in 1630, he became briefly lord of Acquasparta.

Biography 
Federico Cesi was born to an aristocratic family highly connected in Rome and the Papal States. The family derives its name from Cesi, a little town near Rome. They had a close connection with the Catholic Church, Frederico's uncle Bartolomeo Cesi was a cardinal in the church, and most of their wealth came from that connection. Federico was the first of eleven legitimate male children and was born in Palazzo Cesi, in via della Maschera d'Oro, Rome, on 26 February 1585. His father was Federico, marchese di Monticelli (1562–1630) and his mother was Olimpia Orsini of Todi. In 1614 Cesi was married to Artemisia Colonna, the daughter of Francesco, principe di Palestrina; she died two years later. In 1617 he married Isabella, cousin of Filippo Salviati, the daughter of the Marquis of Lorenzo. In 1618 he moved to Acquasparta and lived there until his death at the age of forty-five.

The Accademia dei Lincei ("Academy of the Lynxes")

In 1603, at the age of eighteen, Cesi invited three slightly older friends, the Dutch physician Johannes van Heeck (in Italy Giovanni Ecchio), and two fellow Umbrians, mathematician Francesco Stelluti of Fabriano and polymath Anastasio de Filiis of Terni to join with him in the founding of the Accademia dei Lincei ("Academy of the Lynxes"), aimed at the understanding of all natural sciences through a method of research based upon observation, experiment, and the inductive method. Their goal was to penetrate the secrets of nature, observing it at both microscopic and macroscopic levels. The four men chose the name "Lincei" (lynx) from Giambattista della Porta's book "Magia Naturalis", which had an illustration of the fabled cat on the cover and the words "...with lynx like eyes, examining those things which manifest themselves, so that having observed them, he may zealously use them". Cesi chose the sharp eyed lynx and the eagle for the academy's symbols. The academy's motto, chosen by Cesi, was: "take care of small things if you want to obtain the greatest results" (minima cura si maxima vis).

Since it was an uncertain time to conduct scientific research — in 1578 the Inquisition had closed Giambattista della Porta's Academia Secretorum Naturae in Naples under suspicion of sorcery — the Accademia dei Lincei had rough beginnings. Cesi's own father forbade Cesi's association with the other three men, suspecting them of undermining his authority and trying to separate his son from family interests. The four "Lynxes" soon returned to their native cities and continued to communicate only by letter, adopting astronomical pen names: Cesi, perpetual president,  was Celívago. Cesi traveled to Naples where he met della Porta, who he seemed to have been corresponding with for some time. There he described his academy to Della Porta, who encouraged Cesi to continue with his endeavors.  The academy survived due to Cesi's personal wealth and his diplomatic skills in navigating the politics of Counter-Reformation Rome.  Cesi expanded the ranks of the academy, recruiting Giambattista della Porta himself in 1610 and Galileo Galilei in 1611. Cesi's letter to Galileo of 21/7/1612 mentioned Kepler's ellipses. Cesi's Academy published Galileo's Istoria e dimostrazione intorno alle macchie solari (Letters on Sunspots) in 1613, The Assayer in 1623, and also had a hand in defending Galileo in his controversies with establishment leaders and ecclesiastical authorities.

Cesi's own intense activity in the academy was cut short by his sudden death in 1630, and the original Accademia dei Lincei did not survive his death. It was revived in its current form of the Pontifical Academy of Sciences, by Pope Pius IX in 1847.

The plant genus Caesia was named in his honour.

Other contributions
 Had a hand in coining the name "telescope".
 Directed excavations of Carsulae.
 First to view fern spores under microscope.

Books by Federico Cesi
 Theatrum totius naturae, a "Universal theatre of nature", which he began around 1615 and never completed; it was a project for a comprehensive encyclopedia of natural history.

Notes

References 

 Federico Cesi - Italian Wikipedia
 COMMITTEE FOR THE NATIONAL IV CENTENNIAL OF THE FOUNDATION ACADEMY OF LINCEI - Federico Cesi
 "The sharp-eyed lynx, outfoxed by nature: Galileo and friends taught us that there is more to observing than meets the eye - Column", Natural History,  May, 1998  by Stephen Jay Gould
 galileo.rice.edu Federico Cesi (1585-1630) and the Accademia dei Lincei, by Luigi Belloni
 David Freedberg, Eye of the Lynx: Galileo, His friends, and the Beginnings of Modern Natural History, Chicago University Press, 2002

1585 births
1630 deaths
Scientists from Rome
Italian naturalists
Members of the Lincean Academy
Cesi family